"Landing in London" is the third single from American alternative rock band 3 Doors Down's third studio album, Seventeen Days (2005). The song was released in Europe on June 8, 2005, and in the United States in November of the same year, where it served as the album's fifth and final single.

Content
The song is about how much someone misses somebody when that person is gone or away; in this case, the man is far away in London and also mentions other cities (Los Angeles, New York) that he has to spend time in away from the woman he loves.

In this ballad, lead singer Brad Arnold duets with Bob Seger, who happened to be recording at the same studio as 3 Doors Down in 2004, working on his album Face the Promise. Asked by the band's manager if he would like to sing on the song, Seger agreed, which had happened only on very rare occasions throughout his musical career. Previously, he had only collaborated four times with other singers and stated that he had hated it every single time. According to bass player Todd Harrell, Seger felt different about this song because it seemed like something he could have written himself. The song is reminiscent of one of Seger's own classic compositions, 1973's "Turn the Page".

Music video
A music video was made for the single and premiered in early 2006. However, Seger does not appear in the video, which uses a different version of the song without his vocal part. An acoustic version of the song (also without Seger) appears on Acoustic EP.

Live performances
On August 2, 2005, Seger made an unexpected guest appearance at the 3 Doors Down concert at DTE Energy Music Theatre in Clarkston, Michigan and performed "Landing in London" live with the band. Afterwards, Arnold told the crowd that they had just witnessed one of the best moments in his life. During 3 Doors Down's co-headlining tour with Daughtry, Chris Daughtry would come on stage during the song and sing Seger's vocal part.

Track listings
 European CD single
 "Landing in London" (radio edit) – 3:59
 "Landing in London" (acoustic version) – 4:45

 European maxi-CD single
 "Landing in London"
 "Landing in London" (acoustic version)
 "Let Me Go" (acoustic version)
 "My World"

Personnel

 Brad Arnold – lead vocals
 Bob Seger – co-lead vocals
 Matt Roberts – lead guitar
 Chris Henderson – rhythm guitar
 Todd Harrell – bass
 Richard Liles – drums
 The Love Sponge String Quartet – strings
 Kirk Kelsey – string arrangement, additional engineering, digital editing
 Johhny K – production, engineering
 Andy Wallace – mixing
 Tadpole – additional engineering, digital editing
 Leslie Richter – additional engineering
 Todd Schall – additional engineering

Charts

Release history

References

External links
 

3 Doors Down songs
Bob Seger songs
2005 singles
2005 songs
Music videos directed by Wayne Isham
Republic Records singles
Song recordings produced by Johnny K
Songs written by Brad Arnold
Songs written by Chris Henderson (American musician)
Songs written by Matt Roberts (musician)
Songs written by Todd Harrell